Washington Mall was an enclosed shopping mall located in South Strabane Township, Washington County, Pennsylvania, just outside the city of Washington, formerly managed by J J Gumberg Co. and now by Oxford Development Company. It is owned by Falconi, a local developer which also owns a number of properties throughout Washington County.

History
The Washington Mall was opened on October 17, 1968 with a total of 45 stores. The mall was anchored by J. C. Penney which had a freestanding auto center. The mall also featured G. C. Murphy, a Thorofare Grocery Store, and Giant Eagle as junior anchors. Staples was under construction in 1996, taking over what was originally the Marianne Shop. Thompson Hardware closed in June 1997, and was later replaced by Dollar General. Pottery Factory Outlet closed its doors in February 1998, and Giant Eagle closed its doors in 1999, however continued to pay its lease through 2001. Afterthoughts closed in December 1999, and Altmeyer closed that same year.

In 2001, JCPenney announced a remodel of their store to introduce houseware and custom decorating departments to the location. A REX store was also announced to open in the former Pottery Factory Outlet space, in addition to a D&K Stores next to Dollar General. At this time the mall's Baskin-Robbins store closed and converted to "Pap Pap's" Ice Cream after the owner said he could no longer afford franchise fees. Plans were announced in 2004 to convert the mall into a more traditional shopping plaza, retaining anchors Staples, JCPenney, and Toys R Us and adding an 88,000 sq ft space for a new anchor. However, these plans were later delayed, and never came to fruition. JCPenney closed in February 2007 and relocated to the defunct Foundry shopping center less than a mile away in March 2007; however, due to ground settling problems at the aforementioned retail complex and financial difficulties with the property owner, JCPenney moved back to the Washington Mall in mid-September 2008. On January 15, 2014, it was announced that JCPenney would be closing as part of a plan to close 33 stores nationwide. The store closed in May 2014.

Toys R Us closed in the company's 2018 bankruptcy. Department store retail chain Gabe’s has since used this vacated space as a distribution center. Only Staples, Grand China Buffet and Harbor Freight Tools, all of which have exterior access, remain open.

The mall was at one time the preeminent place for shopping in Washington. Up until the 1990s, it was faring its own. However, as the crosstown rival Franklin Mall (now Washington Crown Center) was expanded and completely remodeled, Washington Mall was severely affected by this. There have been no plans to redevelop, outparcels and other stores around the mall remain occupied, and the detached cinema that once was associated with the mall was demolished in 2016.

References

External links
 Washington Mall official site-Last known official website page from September 27, 2007 including a lease plan of the time.

Shopping malls in Metro Pittsburgh
Defunct shopping malls in the United States
Buildings and structures in Washington County, Pennsylvania
Shopping malls established in 1968